Governor Marmaduke may refer to:

John S. Marmaduke (1833–1887), 25th Governor of Missouri
Meredith Miles Marmaduke (1791–1864), 8th Governor of Missouri